Buvadi Dakhiyev was a Chechen  soldier; the commander of the Chechen OMON and active participants of the First and Second Wars in Chechnya.

Biography  

Buvadi Dakhiev is born on 28 April 1968 in the town of Urus-Martan. Graduated from the Chechen State University. By education he was a teacher of history and social studies. In the first Chechen war he was the commander of the Chechen riot Police company. After the withdrawal of Federal troops from Chechnya, he lived in Moscow and Latvia. In the second Chechen war — the commander of the Chechen Riot police. Was several times wounded. Awarded the Order Of Courage.

He died 13 September 2006 on the border of Chechnya and Ingushetia.

References

Chechen people
Chechen warlords
People of the Chechen wars
Gendargenoy
1968 births
2006 deaths